"Born Stunna" is a hip hop song by American rapper Birdman. The song features Rick Ross and was produced by Beat Billionaire. The music video was released on June 11, 2012 on Vevo. and was directed by Derick G. The remix, featuring Lil Wayne and Nicki Minaj, was released July 10, 2012.

Track listing
 Digital single

Chart performance

Release history

References 

2012 singles
Birdman (rapper) songs
Rick Ross songs
Cash Money Records singles
2012 songs
Songs written by Rick Ross
Nicki Minaj songs
Songs written by Birdman (rapper)